The Holy Family High School is a private Catholic primary and secondary school for boys located in the suburb of East Andheri in Mumbai, in the state of Maharashtra, India.  While the school is primarily English-medium, there is also a smaller Marathi-medium section that runs in parallel from the fifth to the tenth standard. The school now also has a junior college named Holy Family Junior College for 11th and 12th grade HSC students.  The school is located on Andheri Kurla Road, Andheri East, Mumbai - 400093, Opposite the  Gurdwara Guru Nakak Punjabi Sabha.

History

Holy Family High School was founded in 1944 as a parish institution in an old, single-storied structure by Fr. Denzil Keating, S.J. The school's first headmistress was Maud D'Costa.

In 1963, another school building was constructed adjoining Holy Family Church. It was improved and extended with the help of student efforts such as donations, raffles, and school fêtes. A new hall and classrooms were constructed. This building lacked facilities such as filtered drinking water and a cafeteria. It had an inadequate playground and poor sports facilities, requiring the use of the Vinayalaya Jesuit seminary grounds, behind the school and church buildings. The building was extended in the 1970s to have multiple stories, with additional classrooms and a school hall. The school had female students for a few years. Some were admitted for year 11 science and commerce streams. Earlier in the school's history females were accepted at lower levels as well. A mini-stadium was built on the old school ground using funds donated by Jitendra Shah. A few years later, the building became too small to cater to the growing number of parishioners and the building was sold.

A more spacious building was constructed, with its own playground on a nearby plot of land. On 22 October 1985, Fr. Lisbert D'Souza, S.J., (Provincial Superior of the Bombay Jesuits) blessed the foundation stone and on 16 July 1988 Bishop Ferdinand Fonseca blessed the new building. On 7 January 1989, under the tenure of Jesuit Frs. Tony J. D'Souza as vicar and Francis Gonsalves as principal, the new school building was formally inaugurated by Simon Cardinal Pimenta, the archbishop of Bombay.

In 2005, the school added an amphitheatre and in 2009 a semi-olympic size swimming pool, both at the initiative of the school PTA. Craft and painting courses are offered. Class picnics are held once a year.

A Parent-Teacher Association (PTA) was established in 1964.

50th anniversary

In 1995, the school celebrated its 50th anniversary with a grand celebration including a fireworks display. In the large crowd attending were several of the school's former principals. A time capsule containing fifty years of school information was buried at the foot of the Holy Family statue to be reopened in the year 2045.

60th anniversary

In 2005 the school celebrated its 60th anniversary. Under the initiative of the principal, Fr. Francis Swamy, S.J., and the school's PTA, a five-night fête was held on the school grounds. Celebrities were present for the occasion which was broadcast live on cable TV.

Policies

Academic
Merit cards are presented to students who do well academically.

Disciplinary

Some of the school's past principals have been accused of using excessive corporal punishment in the form of caning as well as, allegedly, random implements such as hockey sticks and knotted whips, even for minor offenses such as tardiness. Also, teachers used wooden rulers to hit students on hands and knuckles or slapped them as a means of punishment.

More recently, however, the school frowns on the use of corporal punishment. Instead, the services of the school's counselor are used. And those who require discipline are presented with cards at school assemblies, the colour of the card indicating the number of wrongdoings.

Civic
In 2004, the school banned the use of plastics by its students out of concern for the environment.

Principals 

The following individuals have served as principal of the school:

See also

 List of Jesuit schools
 List of schools in Mumbai
 Violence against Christians in India

References

External links
Holy Family High School
 Holy Family High School (informal)
 Holy Family High School Parent-Teacher Association
Holy Family Church
 Satellite view of Holy Family High School by Google Maps

Jesuit secondary schools in India
Jesuit primary schools in India
Boys' schools in India
Christian schools in Maharashtra
High schools and secondary schools in Mumbai
Educational institutions established in 1945
1945 establishments in India